King Brothers may refer to:

 King Brothers (bus operator), Australian company
 King Brothers Productions, American film production company

Music
 Dlamini King Brothers, South African choir
 The King Brothers, British pop trio, releases 1957-1967
 The King Brothers (American group), releases 1997-2001
 King Brothers (Japanese group), rock band